Virginia's 24th House of Delegates district elects one of 100 seats in the Virginia House of Delegates, the lower house of the state's bicameral legislature. District 24 represents the cities of Buena Vista and Lexington; counties of Bath and Rockbridge; and parts of Amherst and Augusta counties. Benjamin L. Cline held this seat until his 2018 election to Virginia's 6th congressional district. In a Republican firehouse primary, Rockbridge supervisor Ronnie Campbell won the Republican nomination by one vote.  Christian Worth won the Democratic nomination. Campbell won the  special election  December 18., and held the seat for nearly four years until his death on December 13, 2022.

District officeholders

References

Virginia House of Delegates districts
Buena Vista, Virginia
Lexington, Virginia
Bath County, Virginia
Rockbridge County, Virginia
Amherst County, Virginia
Augusta County, Virginia